Lincoln Plumer (28 September 1875, in Maryland – 14 February 1928, in Hollywood, California) was an American silent film actor. He married actress Rose Plumer. Lincoln Plumer died of heart disease in 1928.

Partial filmography
 The Floor Below (1918)
 The Deep Purple (1920)
 The Girl in the Taxi (1921)
 Her Face Value (1921)
 See My Lawyer (1921)
 The Ten Dollar Raise (1921)
 The Barnstormer (1922)
 The Deuce of Spades (1922)
 Confidence (1922)
 The Glory of Clementina (1922)
 Within the Law (1923)
 The Dangerous Maid (1923)
 Fools Highway (1924)
 Reckless Romance (1924)
 Hold Your Breath (1924)
 A Regular Fellow (1925)
 When the Wife's Away (1926)
 Now I'll Tell One (1927)
 The Tired Business Man (1927)
 Baby Brother (1927)
 Backstage (1927)
 Down the Stretch (1927)
 Alias the Deacon (1928)
 Playin' Hookey (1928)
 The Masked Angel (1928)
 The Bullet Mark (1928)

External links

 

1875 births
1928 deaths
Male actors from Maryland
American male silent film actors
20th-century American male actors